Santa Bárbara is one of the 67 municipalities of Chihuahua, in northern Mexico. The municipal seat lies at Santa Bárbara. The municipality, one of the smallest in Chihuahua, covers an area of 424.2 km2.

As of 2010, the municipality had a total population of 10,427, up from 10,120 as of 2005.

As of 2010, the city of Santa Bárbara had a population of 8,765. Other than the city of Santa Bárbara, the municipality had 105 localities, none of which had a population over 1,000.

Geography

Towns and villages
The municipality has 53 localities. The largest are:

References

Municipalities of Chihuahua (state)